Benjamin F. Koop is a Canadian molecular biologist and evolutionary geneticist. , he is a Tier 1 Canada Research Chair in Genomics and Molecular Biology at the University of Victoria.

Early life and education
Koop is a native of Fort St. John, British Columbia but earned his Bachelor of Science degree and Master's degree from Texas Tech University. Following this, he completed his PhD in molecular biology and genetics from Wayne State University and a postdoctoral fellowship at the California Institute of Technology.

Career
Upon completing his postdoctoral fellowship, Koop returned to his home province and joined the biology department at the University of Victoria (UVic) in 1992. During his early tenure at the school, he collaborated with Leroy Hood at the University of Washington and six assistants to focuses on the similarities in the DNA of various species. As a result, he received a grant from the Canadian Genome Analysis and Technology Project to research the sequence of genes responsible for genetic disorders.  In 1996, he collaborated in documenting a segment of the human beta T-cell, which was then the largest human genome sequence. Upon being promoted to department chair in July 2000, Koop's research earned him a Natural Sciences and Engineering Research Council Steacie Fellowship.

During his second year of the Steacie Fellowship, while also serving as director of UVic’s center for biomedical research, Koop was named a Tier 1 Canada Research Chair (CRC) in Genomics and Molecular Biology. He received the CRC to fund research into the immune system genes and salmon genomics. At the same time, Koop was named the co-leader of the Genomics Research on Atlantic Salmon Project (GRASP), an international project to map the salmon genome. Subsequently, he built on the data collected from GRASP to lead the Consortium for Genomics Research on All Salmonids Project. By 2009, Koop lead a third research project titled Genomics in Lice and Salmon, (GiLS) which aimed to use genomics tools to understand how Pacific sea lice interact with their salmonid hosts. He subsequently earned the 2009 Genome BC Award for Scientific Excellence from LifeSciences BC.

As a result of becoming a "world leader in salmonid genomics," Koop was elected a Fellow of the Royal Society of Canada in 2009. The following year, his CRC was renewed for a second term. During the COVID-19 pandemic, Koop and his colleagues in the faculty of science were asked to clear out their freezers in anticipation of storing the COVID-19 vaccine. At the same time, he was also awarded the David H. Turpin Gold Medal for Career Achievement in Research for "having a distinguished record of research that has advanced substantially the discipline."  Publications and citations are listed in Google Scholar

References

External links

Living people
Canadian molecular biologists
People from Fort St. John, British Columbia
Texas Tech University alumni
Wayne State University alumni
Academic staff of the University of Victoria
Fellows of the Royal Society of Canada
Year of birth missing (living people)